Bianet (acronym for ) is a Turkish press agency based in Beyoğlu, Istanbul. Its focus is on human rights and it is mainly funded by a Swedish organization. It is mostly funded by the European Commission through the European Instrument for Democracy and Human Rights (EIDHR). Erol Önderoğlu served as the monitoring editor for Bianet for several years. His work for Bianet included quarterly reports on free speech in Turkey. 

In collaboration with EIDHR and KAOS GL, an association that focuses on LGBT rights, Bianet organized workshops concerning gender specific language in journalism in various cities in Turkey between 2016 and 2018.

Controversies 
Access to the Bianet website was briefly blocked in Turkey on 16 July 2019, after it was included on a list of 136 websites and social media accounts that were deemed a threat to national security. The block was lifted the following day, after protests, and the authorities said that Bianet had been blocked by mistake.

Notes and references

External links
Bianet website (Turkish, English, Kurdish)

Companies based in Istanbul
News agencies based in Turkey
Organizations established in 2000